Paloma Kai Shockley Elsesser (born April 12, 1992) is an American fashion model.

Early life
Elsesser was born in London, England to an African-American mother and a father of Chilean and Swiss descent. Her Grandfather is Swiss and came from a Swiss-Romande town named where her surname is derived from. She was raised in Los Angeles, California and moved to New York City, New York in 2010, to attend The New School to study psychology and literature. Her sister, Ama, is also an actor and model signed to IMG, while her brother Sage Elsesser is a rapper and professional skateboarder.

Career
Elsesser was discovered on Instagram by makeup artist Pat McGrath.

She has modeled for Nike, Inc., Fenty Beauty, Proenza Schouler, and Mercedes-Benz. She has appeared in editorials for fashion magazines such as American Vogue, Vogue España, Teen Vogue, Elle, W, Wonderland Magazine, and Glamour.

In 2018, Elsesser appeared on the cover of British Vogue'''s April issue with Fran Summers, Radhika Nair, Adut Akech, Faretta, Selena Forrest, Halima Aden, Vittoria Ceretti, and Yoon Young Bae. In 2019, Elsesser made her screen acting debut in the Safdie brothers' Uncut Gems.

Elsesser appeared on a cover of Vogue'' in its January 2021 issue.

References

External links

Living people
Plus-size models
American female models
Models from London
Models from Los Angeles
Models from New York City
1992 births
African-American female models
American people of Chilean descent
American people of Swiss descent
21st-century African-American people
21st-century African-American women